"Peach/Heart" is Ai Otsuka's 15th (16th overall) single released under the avex trax label. It was released on 25 July 2007 and was her second (third) single to be released in 2007.

The first A-side, Peach is an upbeat song said to "give the feeling of the refreshing summer sky" and is the theme song of the new summer 2007 drama, Hanazakari no Kimitachi e, starring Maki Horikita, Shun Oguri, and Ikuta Toma. In contrast, the second A-side, Heart is a medium-tempo track which has a "nostalgic feeling". The single also features a rearranged version of the single Renai Shashin called Renai Shashin: Haru.

Promotional videos for both "Peach" and "Heart" were released.

"Peach" has been certified as being downloaded more than 1,000,000 times as a ringtone by the RIAJ, and more than 250,000 times as a full-length download to cellphones.

Track listing

Charts 
Oricon Sales Chart (Japan)

References

Ai Otsuka songs
2007 singles
Oricon Weekly number-one singles
Japanese television drama theme songs
Songs written by Ai Otsuka
2007 songs
Avex Trax singles